Chao Valley is an area located at south of Virú Valley in La Libertad Region, northern Peru. It has significant agricultural resources, notably asparagus and blueberries. The valley rises up on both sides of the Chao River.

Description
Mainly It is an agricultural zone that is part of the project Chavimochic in its third stage.

Localities in the valley
Some localities in Chao valley are:
Chao
Guadalupito

See also
Chavimochic
Trujillo
Valley of Moche
Viru Valley
Jequetepeque Valley

External links

References

Valleys of La Libertad Region